Vasool Raja MBBS is a 2004 Indian Tamil-language comedy drama film directed by Saran. It is a remake of the 2003 Hindi film Munna Bhai M.B.B.S.. The film stars Kamal Haasan in the title role, while Prabhu, Sneha, Prakash Raj, Nagesh, Rohini Hattangadi, Jayasurya, Malavika, Crazy Mohan, Lakshmi Bhaskaran and Karunas play supporting roles. It was released on 12 August 2004.

Plot 
 
Rajaraman, nicknamed "Vasool Raja", is a local don in Chennai who makes a living by collecting money from people who refuse or dilly-dally in paying their debts to others (adithadi), with the help of his right-hand man Vatti. Given that his father Sriman Venkataraman had wished him to be a doctor, he creates the faux Venkataraman Charitable Hospital, and pretends to live in accordance with this wish whenever his father and mother Kasturi visit him in Chennai.

One year later, Raja's plan goes awry when Venkataraman meets an old acquaintance, Dr. Vishwanathan. The two men decide to get Raja married to Vishwanathan's daughter Dr. Janaki aka "Paapu", who was a childhood friend of Raja under that name. At this point, the truth about Raja is revealed. Vishwanathan insults Raja's parents and ridicules them for being ignorant of Raja's real life. Venkataraman and Kasturi, who are both aghast and heartbroken, disown Raja and leave for their village.

Raja, in grief and despair, decides that the only way to redeem himself and gain revenge for the humiliation suffered by his father at the hands of the spiteful Vishwanathan is to become a doctor. He goes to a medical college to obtain an MBBS degree, the graduate medical degree in South Asia.

With the help of Vatti and others, Raja gains admission to the SLR Institute of Medical Sciences by threatening Margabandhu, a faculty member of the college, as well as Margabandhu's father. Upon admission, he again encounters Vishwanathan, who is the college dean. His success there becomes dependent upon the coerced help of Margabandhu.  Margabandhu is initially hostile to Raja but does not reveal the truth to the dean. While Raja's skills as a medical doctor are minimal, he transforms those around him with the "Kattipudi Vaithiyam" ("hugging therapy"), a method of comfort taught to Raja by his mother, and the compassion he shows towards those in need. Despite the school's emphasis on mechanical, Cartesian, impersonal, often bureaucratic relationships between doctors and patients, Raja constantly seeks to impose a more empathetic, almost holistic, regimen. To this end, he defies all convention by treating a brain-dead man as if the man were able to perceive and understand normally; intimidating Dr. Kalidas into admitting and treating a suicide patient; interacting on familiar but autocratic terms with patients; humiliating school bullies; effusively thanking a hitherto-underappreciated cleaner; helping a terminally ill cancer patient named Zakir; and encouraging the patients themselves to make changes in their lives so that they do not need pharmaceuticals or surgery.

Vishwanathan, who perceives all this as symptoms of chaos, is unable to prevent it from expanding and gaining ground at his college. He becomes increasingly irritable, almost to the point of insanity. Repeatedly, this near-dementia is shown when he receives unwelcome tidings and begins laughing in a way that implies that he has gone mad. This behaviour is explained early on as an attempt to practice laughter therapy, an attempt that seems to have backfired. Vishwanathan's laughing serves more to convey his anger than diffuse it. Meanwhile, Janaki becomes increasingly fond of Raja, who, in his turn, becomes unreservedly infatuated with her. Some comedy appears here because Raja is unaware that Janaki and his childhood friend "Paapu" are one and the same; an ignorance that Janaki hilariously exploits. Vishwanathan tries several times to expel Raja, but is often outsmarted by Raja's wit or the affection with which the others at the college regard Raja, having gained superior self-esteem by his methods. In a final attempt, Raja is almost expelled but he injures himself and multiple bones to prevent himself from being expelled.

Margabandhu's senile father is admitted to the hospital and all hope seems lost for him. Having threatened Margabandhu before, Raja's gang knows that he is a passionate board game player and Raja orders for a carrom board to come to hospital. One late night, Raja and his gang play carrom and chat and Margabandhu's father miraculously wakes up and walks to the board, to the shock of the nurses, doctors, and Margabandhu. Raja and Margabandhu's father play against each other and Margabandhu's father wins the match and celebrates. Upon witnessing this, Margabandhu is extremely touched by Raja's gesture and tearfully thanks him for saving his father, dropping his hostility towards Raja and his gang.

Upon recovery, Vishwanathan orders Raja to leave and brings police to throw him out, but everyone in the college protests and blocks the way. Vishwanathan tells the students the truth about Raja, but no one believes him and upon questioning the staff, Margabandhu denies any of Vishwanathan's allegations and claims that Raja is innocent. Infuriated, Vishwanathan challenges Raja to answer all questions asked by the doctors in front of the entire university and Raja accepts. Despite preparing well and getting help from Margabandhu and supporting staff, Raja is unable to focus as Zakir's condition becomes worse and Zakir dies in Raja's hands.

The next morning, Raja starts answering the questions well, but Vishwanathan stops the staff and says he will ask all the forthcoming questions, shocking everyone. Raja is unable to answer and is shamed into leaving the college. He confesses the truth to everyone and breaks down about his guilt to Zakir, his parents, and everyone he cared for. Everyone, except Vishwanathan (who smiles maliciously throughout the speech), are moved to tears by his speech. In the moments immediately following Raja's departure, the brain-dead man miraculously awakens from his vegetative state; at this point, Janaki gives a heartfelt speech wherein she criticises her father for having banished Raja, saying that to do so is to banish hope, compassion, love, happiness, etc. from the college. Vishwanathan eventually realises his folly.

Raja later marries Janaki, learning for the first time that she is "Paapu", while also reconciling with his parents, who appreciate him for the first time in many years.

Cast 

Kamal Haasan as Rajaraman Venkatraman (alias "Vasool Raja")
Prabhu as Vatti
Sneha as Janaki Vishwanathan (alias "Paapu")
Prakash Raj as Dr. Vishwanathan
Nagesh as Venkatraman
 Lakshmi as Janaki's mother
Rohini Hattangadi as Kasturi Venkatraman
Crazy Mohan as Professor Margabandhu
Jayasurya as Zakir
Malavika as Priya
Karunas as Kalaialangaram
Arun as the dejected lover
Ajay Rathnam as Medicine Professor
Kavithalayaa Krishnan as Surgery Professor
Nithin Sathya as Neelakandan
Chitra Lakshmanan as Dr. Kalidas
Thalaivasal Vijay as Doctor
Santhana Bharathi as Gangadharan
Kaka Radhakrishnan as Margabandhu's father
Madhan Bob as Mani Raja, Raja's client
Vaiyapuri as Piles Patient
E. Ramdoss as Ward Boy
Karate Raja as Raja's sidekick
Sukumar as Raja's sidekick
Sampath Ram as Raja's sidekick
Meera Krishnan as Mani Raja's wife
A. K. Veerasami as Hospital Cleaner
Kaajal Pasupathi as Nurse
Boys Rajan as Professor
 Mythili as Nurse
Yatin Karyekar as Anand, the Coma Patient
Benjamin as Pickpocket
Scissor Manohar as Coconut water seller
Ragasya as dancer in song "Cheena Thaana"

Production 
Manohar Prasad of Gemini Film Circuit bought the remake rights of Munna Bhai MBBS to make it in Tamil and assigned Saran as director with Kamal Haasan in lead. Saran who was making Attahasam at that time was assigned to commence the film within 15 days and to complete and release the film within three months after consulting Ajith Kumar who gave permission to do this film. To commence the film within 15 days, Saran assigned his usual crew consisting of music composer Bharadwaj and cinematographer A. Venkatesh.

The film was initially titled Market Raja MBBS which Saran later used as a title for his 2019 film. It was Crazy Mohan who suggested the title Vasool Raja MBBS. The project began as a bilingual venture in Tamil and Telugu, though later the Telugu version was made separately with a different cast as Shankar Dada M.B.B.S. (2004).

Jyothika was initially approached to play the leading female role but her busy in another film meant that the team sought and consequently signed on actress Sneha for the film. Prabhu was cast in a supporting role at the insistence of Kamal Haasan, despite Saran's desire to cast Kalabhavan Mani. Saran also thought of casting Karunas initially for Prabhu's character but later created a new character for him.

Saran had hoped to sign on director K. Balachander to play Kamal Haasan's father in the film, with the veteran director being both Kamal Haasan's and Saran's film industry mentor. However Balachandar was reluctant to act, and the team then considered both K. Viswanath and Girish Karnad for the role, before signing Nagesh. Yatin Karyekar and Rohini Hattangadi, who were part of the Hindi original, reprised their roles. Dhanush initially agreed to play the cancer patient but opted out citing a busy schedule and was replaced by Jayasurya.

Saran observed Prakash Raj using hand gestures a lot while emoting so in order to capitalise on that, he created a "back and forth scene" focusing on their actions and was shot using closeup lenses. The film's producers after watching the copy of the film were dissatisfied with the film as they felt director did not remain faithful to the original material but Saran convinced them this version will be responded well by audiences.

Soundtrack 
The soundtrack was composed by Bharadwaj. All songs were penned by Vairamuthu. Mohan Thambirajah of New Straits Times rated it 3.5 out of 5 and wrote, "Bharadwaj comes up with great compositions in this outing". The audio launch was held in July 2004.

Reception 
Shobha Warrier of Rediff.com wrote, "Vasool Raja is Kamal's show all the way. He does comedy, dances wonderfully, sings, and also does some great stunts. What more can people ask for by way of entertainment?". Visual Dasan of Kalki wrote that the Kamal Haasan-Charan combo got a doctorate in laughing medicine for Tamil fans who were left irritated with masala films. However Malini Mannath of Chennai Online gave a negative review, citing "Munnabhai...' was a laugh-riot, 'Vasoolraja...' hardly tickles!." K. N. Vijiyan of New Straits Times wrote, "Vasoolraja MBBS (King of Revenue) should live up to its name".

Box office 
Made on a budget of 5.5 crore, Vasool Raja MBBS was sold for 1 crore in Coimbatore distribution territory with 20 prints. The film was shown on about 285 screens worldwide to highly positive reception and box-office success. Tabloid reported 10 million tickets were sold worldwide.

Controversy 
The film's release faced a roadblock as a petition filed by the then Tamil Nadu Medical Council president K. R. Balasubramanian stated that the film's title ridiculed the medical profession and tarnished the image of the medical fraternity. The Madras High Court later cleared the film's release without the title changed.

References

External links 
 

2000s Tamil-language films
2004 comedy-drama films
2004 films
Films directed by Saran
Films scored by Bharadwaj (composer)
Films set in Chennai
Films shot in Chennai
Films with screenplays by Crazy Mohan
Indian comedy-drama films
Indian gangster films
Medical-themed films
Tamil remakes of Hindi films